This is a list of female entertainers of the Harlem Renaissance, a cultural, social, and artistic explosion that took place in Harlem, New York, in the 1920s.

Dancers, choreographers, and orchestra leaders

Hallie Anderson
Josephine Baker
Anita Bush
Olga Burgoyne
Ida Forsyne
Aurora Greely
Norma Miller
Aida Overton Walker
Elisabeth Welch

Singers and musicians
*Gladys Bentley
May Alix
Marian Anderson
Lil Hardin Armstrong
Lovie Austin
Ada Brown
Lillyn Brown
Blanche Calloway
Minto Cato
Juanita Stinnette Chappelle
Inez Clough
Ida Cox
Ruby Elzy
Adelaide Hall
Hazel Harrison
Lucille Hegamin
Bertha Hill
Mattie Hite
Billie Holiday
Lena Horne
Alberta Hunter
Caterina Jarboro
Matilda Sissieretta Joyner Jones
Sara Martin
Rose McClendon
Viola McCoy
Florence Mills
Ma Rainey
Bessie Smith
Mamie Smith
Trixie Smith
Valaida Snow
Victoria Spivey
Florence Cole Talbert
Eva Taylor
Big Mama Thornton
Sippie Wallace
Whitman Sisters
Edith Wilson
Lena Wilson

Actresses and entertainers

Etta Moten Barnett
Louise Beavers
Gladys Bentley
Birleanna Blanks
Laura Bowman
Blanche Dunn
Evelyn Ellis
Mercedes Gilbert
Gertrude Howard
Moms Mabley
Nina Mae McKinney
Ethel Moses
Evelyn Preer
Gertrude Saunders
Ada "Bricktop" Smith
Madame Sul-Te-Wan
Fredi Washington
Ethel Waters

References

Female entertainers
Harlem Renaissance,Female
Lists of women by occupation